Rosa Louise McCauley Parks (February 4, 1913 – October 24, 2005) was an American activist in the civil rights movement best known for her pivotal role in the Montgomery bus boycott. The United States Congress has honored her as "the first lady of civil rights" and "the mother of the freedom movement".
Parks became a NAACP activist in 1943, participating in several high profile civil rights campaigns. On December 1, 1955, in Montgomery, Alabama, Parks rejected bus driver James F. Blake's order to vacate a row of four seats in the "colored" section in favor of a White passenger, once the "White" section was filled. Parks was not the first person to resist bus segregation, but the National Association for the Advancement of Colored People (NAACP) believed that she was the best candidate for seeing through a court challenge after her arrest for civil disobedience in violating Alabama segregation laws, and she helped inspire the Black community to boycott the Montgomery buses for over a year. The case became bogged down in the state courts, but the federal Montgomery bus lawsuit Browder v. Gayle resulted in a November 1956 decision that bus segregation is unconstitutional under the Equal Protection Clause of the 14th Amendment to the U.S. Constitution.

Parks's act of defiance and the Montgomery bus boycott became important symbols of the movement. She became an international icon of resistance to racial segregation, and organized and collaborated with civil rights leaders, including Edgar Nixon and Martin Luther King Jr. At the time, Parks was employed as a seamstress at a local department store and was secretary of the Montgomery chapter of the NAACP. She had recently attended the Highlander Folk School, a Tennessee center for training activists for workers' rights and racial equality. Although widely honored in later years, she also suffered for her act; she was fired from her job, and received death threats for years afterwards. Shortly after the boycott, she moved to Detroit, where she briefly found similar work. From 1965 to 1988, she served as secretary and receptionist to John Conyers, an African-American US Representative. She was also active in the Black Power movement and the support of political prisoners in the US.

After retirement, Parks wrote her autobiography and continued to insist that there was more work to be done in the struggle for justice. Parks received national recognition, including the NAACP's 1979 Spingarn Medal, the Presidential Medal of Freedom, the Congressional Gold Medal, and a posthumous statue in the United States Capitol's National Statuary Hall. Upon her death in 2005, she was the first woman to lie in honor in the Capitol Rotunda. California and Missouri commemorate Rosa Parks Day on her birthday, February 4, while Ohio, Oregon, and Texas commemorate the anniversary of her arrest, December 1.

Early life
Rosa Parks was born Rosa Louise McCauley in Tuskegee, Alabama, on February 4, 1913, to Leona (née Edwards), a teacher, and James McCauley, a carpenter. In addition to African ancestry, one of Parks's great-grandfathers was Scots-Irish and one of her great-grandmothers a part-Native American slave. She was small as a child and suffered poor health with chronic tonsillitis. When her parents separated, she moved with her mother to Pine Level, just outside the state capital, Montgomery. She grew up on a farm with her maternal grandparents, mother, and younger brother Sylvester. They all were members of the African Methodist Episcopal Church (AME), a century-old independent Black denomination founded by free Blacks in Philadelphia, Pennsylvania, in the early nineteenth century.

McCauley attended rural schools until the age of eleven. Before that, her mother taught her "a good deal about sewing". She started piecing quilts from around the age of six, as her mother and grandmother were making quilts, she put her first quilt together by herself around the age of ten, which was unusual, as quilting was mainly a family activity performed when there was no field work or chores to be done. She learned more sewing in school from the age of eleven; she sewed her own "first dress [she] could wear". As a student at the Industrial School for Girls in Montgomery, she took academic and vocational courses. Parks went on to a laboratory school set up by the Alabama State Teachers College for Negroes for secondary education, but dropped out in order to care for her grandmother and later her mother, after they became ill.

Around the turn of the 20th century, the former Confederate states had adopted new constitutions and electoral laws that effectively disenfranchised Black voters and, in Alabama, many poor White voters as well. Under the White-established Jim Crow laws, passed after Democrats regained control of southern legislatures, racial segregation was imposed in public facilities and retail stores in the South, including public transportation. Bus and train companies enforced seating policies with separate sections for Blacks and Whites. School bus transportation was unavailable in any form for Black schoolchildren in the South, and Black education was always underfunded.

Parks recalled going to elementary school in Pine Level, where school buses took White students to their new school and Black students had to walk to theirs:

I'd see the bus pass every day ... But to me, that was a way of life; we had no choice but to accept what was the custom. The bus was among the first ways I realized there was a Black world and a White world.

Although Parks's autobiography recounts early memories of the kindness of White strangers, she could not ignore the racism of her society. When the Ku Klux Klan marched down the street in front of their house, Parks recalls her grandfather guarding the front door with a shotgun. The Montgomery Industrial School, founded and staffed by White northerners for Black children, was burned twice by arsonists. Its faculty was ostracized by the White community.

Repeatedly bullied by White children in her neighborhood, Parks often fought back physically. She later said: "As far back as I remember, I could never think in terms of accepting physical abuse without some form of retaliation if possible."

Early activism
In 1932, Rosa married Raymond Parks, a barber from Montgomery. He was a member of the NAACP, which at the time was collecting money to support the defense of the Scottsboro Boys, a group of Black men falsely accused of raping two White women. Rosa took numerous jobs, ranging from domestic worker to hospital aide. At her husband's urging, she finished her high school studies in 1933, at a time when fewer than 7% of African Americans had a high-school diploma.

In December 1943, Parks became active in the civil rights movement, joined the Montgomery chapter of the NAACP, and was elected secretary at a time when this was considered a woman's job. She later said, "I was the only woman there, and they needed a secretary, and I was too timid to say no." She continued as secretary until 1957. She worked for the local NAACP leader Edgar Nixon, even though he maintained that "Women don't need to be nowhere but in the kitchen." When Parks asked, "Well, what about me?", he replied: "I need a secretary and you are a good one."

In 1944, in her capacity as secretary, she investigated the gang-rape of Recy Taylor, a Black woman from Abbeville, Alabama. Parks and other civil rights activists organized "The Committee for Equal Justice for Mrs. Recy Taylor", launching what the Chicago Defender called "the strongest campaign for equal justice to be seen in a decade". Parks continued her work as an anti-rape activist five years later when she helped organize protests in support of Gertrude Perkins, a Black woman who was raped by two White Montgomery police officers.

Although never a member of the Communist Party, she attended meetings with her husband. The notorious Scottsboro case had been brought to prominence by the Communist Party.

In the 1940s, Parks and her husband were members of the League of Women Voters. Sometime soon after 1944, she held a brief job at Maxwell Air Force Base, which, despite its location in Montgomery, Alabama, did not permit racial segregation because it was federal property. She rode on its integrated trolley. Speaking to her biographer, Parks noted, "You might just say Maxwell opened my eyes up." Parks worked as a housekeeper and seamstress for Clifford and Virginia Durr, a White couple. Politically liberal, the Durrs became her friends. They encouraged—and eventually helped sponsor—Parks in the summer of 1955 to attend the Highlander Folk School, an education center for activism in workers' rights and racial equality in Monteagle, Tennessee. There Parks was mentored by the veteran organizer Septima Clark. In 1945, despite the Jim Crow laws and discrimination by registrars, she succeeded in registering to vote on her third try.

In August 1955, Black teenager Emmett Till was brutally murdered after reportedly flirting with a young White woman while visiting relatives in Mississippi. On November 27, 1955, four days before she would make her stand on the bus, Rosa Parks attended a mass meeting at Dexter Avenue Baptist Church in Montgomery that addressed this case, as well as the recent murders of the activists George W. Lee and Lamar Smith. The featured speaker was T. R. M. Howard, a Black civil rights leader from Mississippi who headed the Regional Council of Negro Leadership. Howard brought news of the recent acquittal of the two men who had murdered Till. Parks was deeply saddened and angry at the news, particularly because Till's case had garnered much more attention than any of the cases she and the Montgomery NAACP had worked on—and yet, the two men still walked free.

Parks arrest and bus boycott

Montgomery buses: law and prevailing customs
In 1900, Montgomery had passed a city ordinance to segregate bus passengers by race. Conductors were empowered to assign seats to achieve that goal. According to the law, no passenger would be required to move or give up their seat and stand if the bus was crowded and no other seats were available. Over time and by custom, however, Montgomery bus drivers adopted the practice of requiring Black riders to move when there were no White-only seats left.

The first four rows of seats on each Montgomery bus were reserved for Whites. Buses had "colored" sections for Black people generally in the rear of the bus, although Blacks composed more than 75% of the ridership. The sections were not fixed but were determined by placement of a movable sign. Black people could sit in the middle rows until the White section filled. If more Whites needed seats, Blacks were to move to seats in the rear, stand, or, if there was no room, leave the bus.

Black people could not sit across the aisle in the same row as White people. The driver could move the "colored" section sign, or remove it altogether. If White people were already sitting in the front, Black people had to board at the front to pay the fare, then disembark and reenter through the rear door.

For years, the Black community had complained that the situation was unfair. Parks said, "My resisting being mistreated on the bus did not begin with that particular arrest. I did a lot of walking in Montgomery."

One day in 1943, Parks boarded a bus and paid the fare. She then moved to a seat, but driver James F. Blake told her to follow city rules and enter the bus again from the back door. When Parks exited the vehicle, Blake drove off without her. Parks waited for the next bus, determined never to ride with Blake again.

Refusal to move

After working all day, Parks boarded the Cleveland Avenue bus, a General Motors Old Look bus belonging to the Montgomery City Lines, around 6 p.m., Thursday, December 1, 1955, in downtown Montgomery. She paid her fare and sat in an empty seat in the first row of back seats reserved for Blacks in the "colored" section. Near the middle of the bus, her row was directly behind the ten seats reserved for White passengers.

Initially, she did not notice that the bus driver was the same man, James F. Blake, who had left her in the rain in 1943. As the bus traveled along its regular route, all of the White-only seats in the bus filled up. The bus reached the third stop in front of the Empire Theater, and several White passengers boarded. Blake noted that two or three White passengers were standing, as the front of the bus had filled to capacity.

The bus driver moved the "colored" section sign behind Parks and demanded that four Black people give up their seats in the middle section so that the White passengers could sit. Years later, in recalling the events of the day, Parks said, "When that white driver stepped back toward us, when he waved his hand and ordered us up and out of our seats, I felt a determination cover my body like a quilt on a winter night."

By Parks's account, Blake said, "Y'all better make it light on yourselves and let me have those seats." Three of them complied. Parks said, "The driver wanted us to stand up, the four of us. We didn't move at the beginning, but he says, 'Let me have these seats.' And the other three people moved, but I didn't." The Black man sitting next to her gave up his seat.

Parks moved, but toward the window seat; she did not get up to move to the redesignated colored section. Parks later said about being asked to move to the rear of the bus, "I thought of Emmett Till – a 14-year-old African American who was lynched in Mississippi in 1955, after being accused of offending a White woman in her family's grocery store, whose killers were tried and acquitted – and I just couldn't go back."

Blake said, "Why don't you stand up?" Parks responded, "I don't think I should have to stand up." Blake called the police to arrest Parks. When recalling the incident for Eyes on the Prize, a 1987 public television series on the Civil Rights Movement, Parks said, "When he saw me still sitting, he asked if I was going to stand up, and I said, 'No, I'm not.' And he said, 'Well, if you don't stand up, I'm going to have to call the police and have you arrested.' I said, 'You may do that.

During a 1956 radio interview with Sydney Rogers in West Oakland several months after her arrest, Parks said she had decided, "I would have to know for once and for all what rights I had as a human being and a citizen."

In her autobiography, My Story, she said:

When Parks refused to give up her seat, a police officer arrested her. As the officer took her away, she recalled that she asked, "Why do you push us around?" She remembered him saying, "I don't know, but the law's the law, and you're under arrest." She later said, "I only knew that, as I was being arrested, that it was the very last time that I would ever ride in humiliation of this kind. ... "

Parks was charged with a violation of Chapter 6, Section 11, segregation law of the Montgomery City code, although technically she had not taken a White-only seat; she had been in a colored section. Edgar Nixon, president of the Montgomery chapter of the NAACP and leader of the Pullman Porters Union, and her friend Clifford Durr bailed Parks out of jail that evening.

Parks did not originate the idea of protesting segregation with a bus sit-in. Those preceding her included Bayard Rustin in 1942, Irene Morgan in 1946, Lillie Mae Bradford in 1951, Sarah Louise Keys in 1952, and the members of the ultimately successful Browder v. Gayle 1956 lawsuit (Claudette Colvin, Aurelia Browder, Susie McDonald, and Mary Louise Smith) who were arrested in Montgomery for not giving up their bus seats months before Parks.

Montgomery bus boycott

Nixon conferred with Jo Ann Robinson, an Alabama State College professor and member of the Women's Political Council (WPC), about the Parks case. Robinson believed it important to seize the opportunity and stayed up all night mimeographing over 35,000 handbills announcing a bus boycott. The Women's Political Council was the first group to officially endorse the boycott.

On Sunday, December 4, 1955, plans for the Montgomery bus boycott were announced at Black churches in the area, and a front-page article in the Montgomery Advertiser helped spread the word. At a church rally that night, those attending agreed unanimously to continue the boycott until they were treated with the level of courtesy they expected, until Black drivers were hired, and until seating in the middle of the bus was handled on a first-come basis.

The next day, Parks was tried on charges of disorderly conduct and violating a local ordinance. The trial lasted 30 minutes. After being found guilty and fined $10, plus $4 in court costs (combined total ), Parks appealed her conviction and formally challenged the legality of racial segregation. In a 1992 interview with National Public Radio's Lynn Neary, Parks recalled:

On the day of Parks's trial—December 5, 1955—the WPC distributed the 35,000 leaflets. The handbill read,

We are ... asking every Negro to stay off the buses Monday in protest of the arrest and trial ... You can afford to stay out of school for one day. If you work, take a cab, or walk. But please, children and grown-ups, don't ride the bus at all on Monday. Please stay off the buses Monday.

It rained that day, but the Black community persevered in their boycott. Some rode in carpools, while others traveled in Black-operated cabs that charged the same fare as the bus, 10 cents.

That evening after the success of the one-day boycott, a group of 16 to 18 people gathered at the Mt. Zion AME Zion Church to discuss boycott strategies. At that time, Parks was introduced but not asked to speak, despite a standing ovation and calls from the crowd for her to speak; when she asked if she should say something, the reply was, "Why, you've said enough." This movement also sparked riots leading up to the 1956 Sugar Bowl.

The group agreed that a new organization was needed to lead the boycott effort if it were to continue. Rev. Ralph Abernathy suggested the name "Montgomery Improvement Association" (MIA). The name was adopted, and the MIA was formed. Its members elected as their president Martin Luther King Jr., a relative newcomer to Montgomery, who was a young and mostly unknown minister of the Dexter Avenue Baptist Church.

That Monday night, 50 leaders of the African-American community gathered to discuss actions to respond to Parks's arrest. Edgar Nixon, the president of the NAACP, said, "My God, look what segregation has put in my hands!" Parks was considered the ideal plaintiff for a test case against city and state segregation laws, as she was seen as a responsible, mature woman with a good reputation. She was securely married and employed, was regarded as possessing a quiet and dignified demeanor, and was politically savvy. King said that Parks was regarded as "one of the finest citizens of Montgomery—not one of the finest Negro citizens, but one of the finest citizens of Montgomery".

Parks's court case was being slowed down in appeals through the Alabama courts on their way to a Federal appeal and the process could have taken years. Holding together a boycott for that length of time would have been a great strain. In the end, Black residents of Montgomery continued the boycott for 381 days. Dozens of public buses stood idle for months, severely damaging the bus transit company's finances, until the city repealed its law requiring segregation on public buses following the US Supreme Court ruling in Browder v. Gayle that it was unconstitutional. Parks was not included as a plaintiff in the Browder decision because the attorney Fred Gray concluded the courts would perceive they were attempting to circumvent her prosecution on her charges working their way through the Alabama state court system.

Parks played an important part in raising international awareness of the plight of African Americans and the civil rights struggle. King wrote in his 1958 book Stride Toward Freedom that Parks's arrest was the catalyst rather than the cause of the protest: "The cause lay deep in the record of similar injustices." He wrote, "Actually, no one can understand the action of Mrs. Parks unless he realizes that eventually the cup of endurance runs over, and the human personality cries out, 'I can take it no longer.'"

Detroit years

1960s

After her arrest, Parks became an icon of the Civil Rights Movement but suffered hardships as a result. Due to economic sanctions used against activists, she lost her job at the department store. Her husband lost his job as a barber at Maxwell Air Force Base after his boss forbade him to talk about his wife or the legal case. Parks traveled and spoke about the issues.

In 1957, Raymond and Rosa Parks left Montgomery for Hampton, Virginia; mostly because she was unable to find work. She also disagreed with King and other leaders of Montgomery's struggling civil rights movement about how to proceed, and was constantly receiving death threats. In Hampton, she found a job as a hostess in an inn at Hampton Institute, a historically Black college.

Later that year, at the urging of her brother and sister-in-law in Detroit, Sylvester and Daisy McCauley, Rosa and Raymond Parks and her mother moved north to join them. The City of Detroit attempted to cultivate a progressive reputation, but Parks encountered numerous signs of discrimination against African-Americans. Schools were effectively segregated, and services in Black neighborhoods substandard. In 1964, Parks told an interviewer that, "I don't feel a great deal of difference here ... Housing segregation is just as bad, and it seems more noticeable in the larger cities." She regularly participated in the movement for open and fair housing.

Parks rendered crucial assistance in the first campaign for Congress by John Conyers. She persuaded Martin Luther King, who was generally reluctant to endorse local candidates, to appear with Conyers, thereby boosting the novice candidate's profile. When Conyers was elected, he hired her as a secretary and receptionist for his congressional office in Detroit. She held this position until she retired in 1988. In a telephone interview with CNN on October 24, 2005, Conyers recalled, "You treated her with deference because she was so quiet, so serene—just a very special person ... There was only one Rosa Parks." Doing much of the daily constituent work for Conyers, Parks often focused on socio-economic issues including welfare, education, job discrimination, and affordable housing. She visited schools, hospitals, senior citizen facilities, and other community meetings and kept Conyers grounded in community concerns and activism.

Parks participated in activism nationally during the mid-1960s, traveling to support the Selma-to-Montgomery Marches, the Freedom Now Party, and the Lowndes County Freedom Organization. She also befriended Malcolm X, who she regarded as a personal hero.

Like many Detroit Blacks, Parks remained particularly concerned about housing issues. She herself lived in a neighborhood, Virginia Park, which had been compromised by highway construction and urban renewal. By 1962, these policies had destroyed 10,000 structures in Detroit, displacing 43,096 people, 70 percent of them African-American. Parks lived just a mile from the center of the riot that took place in Detroit in 1967, and she considered housing discrimination a major factor that provoked the disorder.

In the aftermath Parks collaborated with members of the League of Revolutionary Black Workers and the Republic of New Afrika in raising awareness of police abuse during the conflict. She served on a "people's tribunal" on August 30, 1967, investigating the killing of three young men by police during the 1967 Detroit uprising, in what came to be known as the Algiers Motel incident. She also helped form the Virginia Park district council to help rebuild the area. The council facilitated the building of the only Black-owned shopping center in the country. Parks took part in the Black power movement, attending the Philadelphia Black Power conference, and the Black Political Convention in Gary, Indiana. She also supported and visited the Black Panther school in Oakland.

1970s

In the 1970s, Parks organized for the freedom of political prisoners in the United States, particularly cases involving issues of self-defense. She helped found the Detroit chapter of the Joanne Little Defense Committee, and also worked in support of the Wilmington 10, the RNA 11, and Gary Tyler. When Angela Davis was acquitted, Parks introduced her to an audience of 12,000 as a "dear sister who has suffered so much persecution". Following national outcry around her case, Little succeeded in her defense that she used deadly force to resist sexual assault and was acquitted. Tyler was finally released in April 2016 after 41 years in prison.

The 1970s were a decade of loss for Parks in her personal life. Her family was plagued with illness; she and her husband had suffered stomach ulcers for years and both required hospitalization. In spite of her fame and constant speaking engagements, Parks was not a wealthy woman. She donated most of the money from speaking to civil rights causes, and lived on her staff salary and her husband's pension. Medical bills and time missed from work caused financial strain that required her to accept assistance from church groups and admirers.

Her husband died of throat cancer on August 19, 1977, and her brother, her only sibling, died of cancer that November. Her personal ordeals caused her to become removed from the civil rights movement. She learned from a newspaper of the death of Fannie Lou Hamer, once a close friend. Parks suffered two broken bones in a fall on an icy sidewalk, an injury which caused considerable and recurring pain. She decided to move with her mother into an apartment for senior citizens. There she nursed her mother Leona through the final stages of cancer and geriatric dementia until she died in 1979 at the age of 92.

1980s
In 1980, Parks—widowed and without immediate family—rededicated herself to civil rights and educational organizations. She co-founded the Rosa L. Parks Scholarship Foundation for college-bound high school seniors, to which she donated most of her speaker fees. In February 1987, she co-founded, with Elaine Eason Steele, the Rosa and Raymond Parks Institute for Self Development, an institute that runs the "Pathways to Freedom" bus tours which introduce young people to important civil rights and Underground Railroad sites throughout the country. Parks also served on the Board of Advocates of Planned Parenthood.

Though her health declined as she entered her seventies, Parks continued to make many appearances and devoted considerable energy to these causes. Unrelated to her activism, Parks loaned quilts of her own making to an exhibit at Michigan State University of quilts by African-American residents of Michigan.

1990s

In 1992, Parks published Rosa Parks: My Story, an autobiography aimed at younger readers, which recounts her life leading to her decision to keep her seat on the bus. A few years later, she published Quiet Strength (1995), her memoir, which focuses on her faith.

At age 81, Parks was robbed and assaulted in her home in central Detroit on August 30, 1994. The assailant, Joseph Skipper, broke down the door but claimed he had chased away an intruder. He requested a reward and when Parks paid him, he demanded more. Parks refused and he attacked her. Hurt and badly shaken, Parks called a friend, who called the police. A neighborhood manhunt led to Skipper's capture and reported beating. Parks was treated at Detroit Receiving Hospital for facial injuries and swelling on the right side of her face. Parks said about the attack on her by the African-American man, "Many gains have been made ... But as you can see, at this time we still have a long way to go." Skipper was sentenced to 8 to 15 years and was transferred to prison in another state for his own safety.

Suffering anxiety upon returning to her small central Detroit house following the ordeal, Parks moved into Riverfront Towers, a secure high-rise apartment building. Learning of Parks's move, Little Caesars owner Mike Ilitch offered to pay for her housing expenses for as long as necessary.

In 1994, the Ku Klux Klan applied to sponsor a portion of United States Interstate 55 in St. Louis County and Jefferson County, Missouri, near St. Louis, for cleanup (which allowed them to have signs stating that this section of highway was maintained by the organization). Since the state could not refuse the KKK's sponsorship, the Missouri legislature voted to name the highway section the "Rosa Parks Highway". When asked how she felt about this honor, she is reported to have commented, "It is always nice to be thought of."

In 1999, Parks filmed a cameo appearance for the television series Touched by an Angel. It was her last appearance on screen; Parks began to suffer from health problems due to old age.

2000s
In 2002, Parks received an eviction notice from her $1,800 per month apartment for non-payment of rent. Parks was incapable of managing her own financial affairs by this time due to age-related physical and mental decline. Her rent was paid from a collection taken by Hartford Memorial Baptist Church in Detroit. When her rent became delinquent and her impending eviction was highly publicized in 2004, executives of the ownership company announced they had forgiven the back rent and would allow Parks, by then 91 and in extremely poor health, to live rent-free in the building for the remainder of her life. Elaine Steele, manager of the nonprofit Rosa and Raymond Parks Institute, defended Parks's care and stated that the eviction notices were sent in error. Several of Parks's family members alleged that her financial affairs had been mismanaged.

In 2016, Parks's former residence in Detroit was threatened with demolition. A Berlin-based American artist, Ryan Mendoza, arranged to have the house disassembled, moved to his garden in Germany, and partly restored. It served as a museum honoring Rosa Parks. In 2018, the house was moved back to the United States. Brown University was planning to exhibit the house, but the display was cancelled. The house was exhibited during part of 2018 in an arts centre in Providence, Rhode Island.

Death and funeral
Parks died of natural causes on October 24, 2005, at the age of 92, in her apartment on the east side of Detroit. She and her husband never had children and she outlived her only sibling. She was survived by her sister-in-law (Raymond's sister), 13 nieces and nephews and their families, and several cousins, most of them residents of Michigan or Alabama.

City officials in Montgomery and Detroit announced on October 27, 2005, that the front seats of their city buses would be reserved with black ribbons in honor of Parks until her funeral. Parks' coffin was flown to Montgomery and taken in a horse-drawn hearse to the St. Paul African Methodist Episcopal (AME) church, where she lay in repose at the altar on October 29, 2005, dressed in the uniform of a church deaconess. A memorial service was held there the following morning. One of the speakers, United States Secretary of State Condoleezza Rice, said that if it had not been for Parks, she would probably have never become the Secretary of State. In the evening the casket was transported to Washington, D.C. and transported by a bus similar to the one in which she made her protest, to lie in honor in the rotunda of the U.S. Capitol.

Since the founding of the practice in 1852, Parks was the 31st person, the first American who had not been a U.S. government official, and the second private person (after the French planner Pierre L'Enfant) to be honored in this way. She was the first woman and the second Black person to lie in honor in the Capitol. An estimated 50,000 people viewed the casket there, and the event was broadcast on television on October 31, 2005. A memorial service was held that afternoon at Metropolitan AME Church in Washington, D.C.

With her body and casket returned to Detroit, for two days, Parks lay in repose at the Charles H. Wright Museum of African American History. Her funeral service was seven hours long and was held on November 2, 2005, at the Greater Grace Temple Church in Detroit. After the service, an honor guard from the Michigan National Guard draped the U.S. flag over the casket and carried it to a horse-drawn hearse, which was intended to carry it, in daylight, to the cemetery. As the hearse passed the thousands of people who were viewing the procession, many clapped, cheered loudly and released white balloons. Parks was interred between her husband and mother at Detroit's Woodlawn Cemetery in the chapel's mausoleum. The chapel was renamed the Rosa L. Parks Freedom Chapel in her honor.

Legacy and honors

 1963: Paul Stephenson initiated a bus boycott in Bristol, England, to protest a similar color bar operated by a bus company there, inspired by the example of the Montgomery bus boycott initiated by Rosa Parks's refusal to move from "Whites only" bus seat in Montgomery, Alabama.
 1976: Detroit renamed 12th Street "Rosa Parks Boulevard".
 1979: The NAACP awarded Parks the Spingarn Medal, its highest honor,
 1980: She received the Martin Luther King Jr. Award.
 1982: California State University, Fresno, awarded Parks the African-American Achievement Award. The honor, given to deserving students in succeeding years, became the Rosa Parks Awards.
 1983: She was inducted into Michigan Women's Hall of Fame for her achievements in civil rights.
 1984: She received a Candace Award from the National Coalition of 100 Black Women.
 1990:
 Parks was invited to be part of the group welcoming Nelson Mandela upon his release from prison in South Africa.
 Parks was in attendance as part of Interstate 475 outside of Toledo, Ohio, was named after her.
 1992: She received the Peace Abbey Courage of Conscience Award along with Dr. Benjamin Spock and others at the Kennedy Library and Museum in Boston, Massachusetts.
 1993: She was inducted into the National Women's Hall of Fame,
 1994: She received an honorary doctorate from Florida State University in Tallahassee, FL.
 1994: She received an honorary doctorate from Soka University in Tokyo, Japan.
 1995: She received the Academy of Achievement's Golden Plate Award in Williamsburg, Virginia.
 1996: She was awarded the Presidential Medal of Freedom, the highest honor given by the US executive branch.
 1998: She was the first-ever recipient of the International Freedom Conductor Award from the National Underground Railroad Freedom Center, honoring people whose actions support those struggling with modern-day issues related to freedom.
 1999:
 She received the Congressional Gold Medal, the highest award given by the US legislative branch, the medal bears the legend "Mother of the Modern Day Civil Rights Movement"
 She received the Windsor–Detroit International Freedom Festival Freedom Award.
 Time named Parks one of the 20 most influential and iconic figures of the 20th century.
 President Bill Clinton honored her in his State of the Union address, saying, "She's sitting down with the first lady tonight, and she may get up or not as she chooses."
 2000:
 Her home state awarded her the Alabama Academy of Honor,
 She received the first Governor's Medal of Honor for Extraordinary Courage.
 She was awarded two dozen honorary doctorates from universities worldwide
 She was made an honorary member of the Alpha Kappa Alpha sorority.
 the Rosa Parks Library and Museum on the campus of Troy University in Montgomery was dedicated to her.
 2002:
 Scholar Molefi Kete Asante listed Parks on his list of 100 Greatest African Americans.
 A portion of the Interstate 10 freeway in Los Angeles was named in her honor.
 She received the Walter P. Reuther Humanitarian Award from Wayne State University.
 2003: Bus No. 2857, on which Parks was riding, was restored and placed on display in The Henry Ford museum
 2004: In the Los Angeles County MetroRail system, the Imperial Highway/Wilmington station, where the A Line connects with the C Line, has been officially named the "Rosa Parks Station".
 2005:
 Senate Concurrent Resolution 61, 109th Congress, 1st Session, was agreed to October 29, 2005. This set the stage for her to become the 1st woman to lie in honor, in the Capitol Rotunda.
 On October 30, 2005, President George W. Bush issued a proclamation ordering that all flags on U.S. public areas both within the country and abroad be flown at half-staff on the day of Parks's funeral.
 Metro Transit in King County, Washington placed posters and stickers dedicating the first forward-facing seat of all its buses in Parks's memory shortly after her death,
 The American Public Transportation Association declared December 1, 2005, the 50th anniversary of her arrest, to be a "National Transit Tribute to Rosa Parks Day".
 On that anniversary, President George W. Bush signed , directing that a statue of Parks be placed in the United States Capitol's National Statuary Hall. In signing the resolution directing the Joint Commission on the Library to do so, the President stated:
 
 Portion of Interstate 96 in Detroit was renamed by the state legislature as the Rosa Parks Memorial Highway in December 2005.
 2006:
 At Super Bowl XL, played at Detroit's Ford Field, long-time Detroit residents Coretta Scott King and Parks were remembered and honored by a moment of silence. The Super Bowl was dedicated to their memory. Parks's nieces and nephews and Martin Luther King III joined the coin toss ceremonies, standing alongside former University of Michigan star Tom Brady who flipped the coin.
 On February 14, Nassau County, New York Executive, Thomas Suozzi announced that the Hempstead Transit Center would be renamed the Rosa Parks Hempstead Transit Center in her honor.
 On October 27, Pennsylvania Governor Ed Rendell signed a bill into law designating the portion of Pennsylvania Route 291 through Chester as the Rosa Parks Memorial Highway.
 2007: Nashville, Tennessee renamed MetroCenter Boulevard (8th Avenue North) (US 41A and SR 12) as Rosa L. Parks Boulevard.
 On March 14, 2008, the State of California Government Center at 464 W. 4th St., on the northwest corner of Court and 4th streets, in San Bernardino was renamed the Rosa Parks Memorial Building.
 2009: On July 14, the Rosa Parks Transit Center opened in Detroit at the corner of Michigan and Cass Avenues.
 2010: in Grand Rapids, Michigan, a plaza in the heart of the city was named Rosa Parks Circle.
 2012: 
 A street in West Valley City, Utah (the state's second largest city), leading to the Utah Cultural Celebration Center was renamed Rosa Parks Drive.

 2013:
 On February 1, President Barack Obama proclaimed February 4, 2013, as the "100th Anniversary of the Birth of Rosa Parks". He called "upon all Americans to observe this day with appropriate service, community, and education programs to honor Rosa Parks's enduring legacy".
 On February 4, to celebrate Rosa Parks's 100th birthday, the Henry Ford Museum declared the day a "National Day of Courage" with 12 hours of virtual and on-site activities featuring nationally recognized speakers, musical and dramatic interpretative performances, a panel presentation of "Rosa's Story" and a reading of the tale "Quiet Strength". The actual bus on which Rosa Parks sat was made available for the public to board and sit in the seat that Rosa Parks refused to give up.
 On February 4, 2,000 birthday wishes gathered from people throughout the United States were transformed into 200 graphics messages at a celebration held on her 100th Birthday at the Davis Theater for the Performing Arts in Montgomery, Alabama. This was the 100th Birthday Wishes Project managed by the Rosa Parks Museum at Troy University and the Mobile Studio and was also a declared event by the Senate.
 During both events the USPS unveiled a postage stamp in her honor.
 On February 27, Parks became the first African-American woman to have her likeness depicted in National Statuary Hall. The monument, created by sculptor Eugene Daub, is a part of the Capitol Art Collection among nine other females featured in the National Statuary Hall Collection.
 2014: The asteroid 284996 Rosaparks, discovered in 2010 by the Wide-field Infrared Survey Explorer, was named in her memory. The official  was published by the Minor Planet Center on September 9, 2014.
 2015:
 The papers of Rosa Parks were cataloged into the Library of Congress, after years of a legal battle.
 On December 13, the new Rosa Parks Railway Station opened in Paris, France.
 2016: 
 The house lived in by Rosa Parks's brother, Sylvester McCauley, his wife Daisy, and their 13 children, and where Rosa Parks often visited and stayed after leaving Montgomery, was bought by her niece Rhea McCauley for $500 and donated to the artist Ryan Mendoza. It was subsequently dismantled and shipped to Berlin where it was re-erected in Mendoza's garden. In 2018 it was returned to the United States and rebuilt at the Waterfire Arts Center, Providence, Rhode Island, where it was put on public display, accompanied by a range of interpretive materials and public and scholarly events.
 The National Museum of African American History and Culture was opened; it contains among other things the dress which Rosa Parks was sewing the day she refused to give up her seat to a White man.
 2018:
 Continuing the Conversation, a public sculpture of Parks, was unveiled on the main campus of the Georgia Institute of Technology.
 2019: 
 A statue of Rosa Parks was unveiled in Montgomery, Alabama.
 2021: 
 On January 20, a bust of Rosa Parks by Artis Lane was added to the Oval Office when Joe Biden began his presidency. The sculpture is currently displayed next to Augustus Saint-Gaudens' bust of Abraham Lincoln.

In popular culture
 In 1979, the Supersisters trading card set was produced and distributed; one of the cards featured Parks's name and picture. She is card #27 in the set.
 In March 1999, Parks filed a lawsuit (Rosa Parks v. LaFace Records) against American hip-hop duo OutKast and their record company, claiming that the duo's song "Rosa Parks", the most successful radio single of their 1998 album Aquemini, had used her name without permission. The lawsuit was settled on April 15, 2005 (six months and nine days before Parks's death); OutKast, their producer and record labels paid Parks an undisclosed cash settlement. They also agreed to work with the Rosa and Raymond Parks Institute to create educational programs about the life of Rosa Parks. The record label and OutKast admitted no wrongdoing. Responsibility for the payment of legal fees was not disclosed.
 The documentary Mighty Times: The Legacy of Rosa Parks (2001) received a 2002 nomination for Academy Award for Documentary Short Subject. She collaborated on a TV movie of her life, The Rosa Parks Story (2002), starring Angela Bassett.
 The film Barbershop (2002) featured a barber, played by Cedric the Entertainer, arguing with others that other African Americans before Parks had been active in bus integration, but she was renowned as an NAACP secretary. The activists Jesse Jackson and Al Sharpton launched a boycott against the film, contending it was "disrespectful", but NAACP president Kweisi Mfume stated he thought the controversy was "overblown". Parks was offended and boycotted the NAACP 2003 Image Awards ceremony, which Cedric hosted.
 In 2013, Parks was portrayed by Llewella Gideon in the first series of the Sky Arts comedy series Psychobitches.
 The 2018 episode "Rosa", of the science-fiction television series Doctor Who, centers on Rosa Parks, as portrayed by Vinette Robinson.
 The UK children's historical show Horrible Histories honored Parks by creating a song to close an episode, "Rosa Parks: I Sat on a Bus".
 In 2019, Mattel released a Barbie doll in Parks's likeness as part of their "Inspiring Women" series.
In 2020, rapper Nicki Minaj incorporated Rosa Parks into her song "Yikes" where she rapped, "All you bitches Rosa Park, uh-oh, get your ass up" in reference to the Montgomery bus boycott.
In 2022, the documentary The Rebellious Life of Mrs. Rosa Parks was released on Peacock; it is the first full-length documentary about Parks.
In 2022, a major motion film Bowl Game Armageddon was announced, which will spotlight Rosa Parks and Emmett Till leading up to the 1956 Sugar Bowl and Atlanta riots

See also

 Elizabeth Jennings Graham, 1854 sued and won case that led to desegregation of streetcars in New York City 
 Charlotte L. Brown, desegregated streetcars in San Francisco in the 1860s 
 John Mitchell Jr., in 1904, he organized a Black boycott of Richmond, Virginia's segregated trolley system
 Irene Morgan, in 1944, sued and won Supreme Court ruling that segregation of interstate buses was unconstitutional
 Claudette Colvin
 Cleveland Court Apartments 620–638
 List of civil rights leaders
 Rosa Parks Act
 Timeline of the civil rights movement

Notes

References

Further reading

 Barnes, Catherine A. Journey from Jim Crow: The Desegregation of Southern Transit, Columbia University Press, 1983.
 Brinkley, Douglas. Rosa Parks: A Life, Penguin Books, October 25, 2005. 
 
 Editorial (May 17, 1974). "Two decades later" . The New York Times. p. 38. ("Within a year of Brown, Rosa Parks, a tired seamstress in Montgomery, Alabama, was, like Homer Plessy sixty years earlier, arrested for her refusal to move to the back of the bus.")
 Parks, Rosa, with James Haskins, Rosa Parks: My Story. New York: Scholastic Inc., 1992. 
 Theoharis, Jeanne The Rebellious Life of Mrs. Rosa Parks, Beacon Press, 2015,

External links

 
 Rosa Parks Library and Museum at Troy University
 The Rosa and Raymond Parks Institute for Self Development
 Parks article in the Encyclopedia of Alabama
 Rosa Parks bus on display at the Henry Ford Museum
 Teaching and Learning Rosa Parks' Rebellious Life
 Norwood, Arlisha. "Rosa Parks". National Women's History Museum. 2017.

Multimedia and interviews
 
 "Civil Rights Icon Rosa Parks Dies"—National Public Radio
 "Civil Rights Pioneer Rosa Parks 1913–2005"—Democracy Now! (democracynow.org)
"Eyes on the Prize; Interview with Rosa Parks," 1985-11-14, American Archive of Public Broadcasting

Others
 Complete audio/video and newspaper archive of the Montgomery bus boycott 
 Rosa Parks: cadre of working-class movement that ended Jim Crow
 
 
 Photo of Rosa Parks Childhood Home

 
1913 births
2005 deaths
Activists from Detroit
African-American activists
African-American Christians
African-American history of Alabama
African-American Methodists
Activists for African-American civil rights
Activists from Montgomery, Alabama
Alabama State University alumni
American people who self-identify as being of Native American descent
American people of Scotch-Irish descent
Burials at Woodlawn Cemetery (Detroit)
Civil rights protests in the United States
Community organizing
Congressional Gold Medal recipients
Deaths from dementia in Michigan
Montgomery bus boycott
Nonviolence advocates
People from Tuskegee, Alabama
Political prisoners
Political prisoners in the United States
Presidential Medal of Freedom recipients
Protests in Alabama
Spingarn Medal winners